Almir Nurullovich Mukhutdinov (born 9 June 1985) is a Kazakhstani former professional football player. He also holds Russian citizenship.

Career

Club
In February 2013, Mukhutdinov moved to Kazakhstan Premier League side FC Irtysh Pavlodar, leaving them following the conclusion of the 2014 season.

Tobol
In January 2016, Mukhutdinov signed for FC Tobol, extending his contract with the club the following January.

International
In October 2015, Mukhutdinov was called up to the Kazakhstan national team for the first time. He made his national team debut on 7 June 2016 in a friendly against China.

Career statistics

Club

International

Statistics accurate as of match played 11 November 2016

References

External links
 

1985 births
Living people
People from Taraz
Association football midfielders
Kazakhstani footballers
Russian footballers
Kazakhstan international footballers
Russian First League players
Russian Second League players
Kazakhstan Premier League players
FC Okean Nakhodka players
FC Krasnodar players
FC Dynamo Bryansk players
FC Volgar Astrakhan players
FC Irtysh Pavlodar players
FC Lokomotiv Kaluga players
FC Taraz players
FC Tobol players
FC Zhetysu players
FC Orenburg players
FC Yenisey Krasnoyarsk players